Pavlos Tassios (1 April 1942 – 2 October 2011) was a Greek film director.

Born in Polygyros, Greece, he directed such films as Ta vaporakia, Stigma, Parangelia!, To vary... peponi, Oi prostates, and Nai men, alla...

He was married to Katerina Gogou, with whom he had a daughter. He died in Athens, aged 69, on 2 October 2011, from undisclosed causes.

References

External links

1942 births
2011 deaths
Greek film directors
People from Polygyros